Hotel Kingston is an Indian TV series which aired on Star One from 11 November 2004 to 2 November 2005. It was produced by Sagar Arts.

Plot
Caught in the midst of Hotel Kingston are Shelly Sahay (Sonal Sehgal) and Vishwamitra (Vish) Kelkar (Amit Varma) - the ideal lovers with their pyar bhari takrar. She the NRI and he the simple middle class guy. Their worlds come together to run the Hotel Kingston. Hate turns into liking and liking into love as these two find the perfect companions in each other.

Cast
 Amit Varma as Vishwamitra (Vish) Kelkar  
 Sonal Sehgal as Shelly Sahay 
 Mouli Ganguly as Urvashi 
 Mayank Anand as Niklesh (Nik) Mehra 
 Shakti Anand as Vishwamitra (Vish) Kelkar
 Abir Goswami as Sujit
 Benjamin Gilani as Govind Sahay 
 Mihir Mishra as Aryan
 Rakshanda Khan as Naina
 Keerti Gaekwad Kelkar 
 Pariva Pranati
 Vinay Jain
 Kurush Deboo as Kidnapper

References

Indian television soap operas
Star One (Indian TV channel) original programming
2004 Indian television series debuts
2005 Indian television series endings